Be Strong may refer to:

Music

Albums
Be Strong (album), 2 Bears album 2012
Be Strong, reggae album by Midnite 
Be I Strong, reggae song by Sizzla 1999

Songs
"Be Strong" (song), song by Delta Goodrem
"Be Strong", reggae song by Frankie Paul, 
"Be Strong", reggae song by Solomon Jones (musician) 1970
"Be Strong Now", song on Let It Come Down (James Iha album)
"Be Strong", song on the 2 Bears album Be Strong

See also
Be Strong, Geum-soon!